The Cooper T33 is a lightweight sports car, designed and developed by British manufacturer Cooper Cars in 1954. Between 1954 and 1958, it managed to score 10 race wins, and 21 podium finishes.

References

Cars of England
1950s cars
Sports racing cars